Lazeh (also Romanized as Lazeh and Lez̧z̧eh) is a village in Mosharrahat Rural District, in the Central District of Ahvaz County, Khuzestan Province, Iran. At the 2006 census, its population was 186, in 33 families.

References 

Populated places in Ahvaz County